The pale baywing (Agelaioides fringillarius), formerly known as the pale cowbird, is a species of bird in the family Icteridae. It is currently placed in the genus Agelaioides, but has traditionally been placed in the genus Molothrus. It was formerly considered conspecific with the greyish baywing, with the combined species then known as bay-winged cowbird.

It is endemic to northeastern Brazil, where it is primarily found in the Caatinga and the northern Cerrado.

References

 Ridgely, R. S.; & Tudor, G. (1989). The Birds of South America vol. 1 - The Oscine Passerines. Oxford University Press. 
 Fraga, R. M. and S. D�Angelo Neto. 2014. Natural history notes and breeding of the Pale Baywing (Agelaioides fringillarius) in northern Minas Gerais, Brazil. Revista Brasileira de Ornitologia, 22: 238–241.

External links

pale baywing
Birds of the Caatinga
Endemic birds of Brazil
pale baywing